Monica Maria Theresia "Monique" van de Ven (born 28 July 1952) is a Dutch actress and director.

Life and career
Her film debut as an actress was in the Paul Verhoeven film Turkish Delight in 1973. This film was an immediate breakthrough for her acting career. It was nominated for an Academy Award and was chosen as the best Dutch film of the century. Thirteen years later she starred in the Oscar-winning film The Assault.

Apart from acting in feature films she also performs in Dutch television series and commercials.

In 1996 she directed the short film Mama's Proefkonijn (English translation: 'Mama's Guinea Pig'); her first feature film as a director Summer Heat (Zomerhitte) was released 2008.

Between 1973 and 1988 she was married to Dutch cinematographer and director Jan de Bont, with whom she lived in Los Angeles for a number of years. She has been married to actor and writer Edwin de Vries since 1991.

Filmography

Actress
Turkish Delight (1973)
Dakota (1974)
Way Out (1974)
Katie Tippel (1975)
The Last Train (1975)
’’Starsky and Hutch, series *’’3, episode 15, A Body       Worth Guarding, Original Air date, January 25 1978
 (1976)
Doctor Vlimmen (1977)
Inheritance (1978)
Stunt Rock (1978)
A Woman Like Eve (1979)
Splitting Up (1979)
Hoge hakken, echte liefde (1981)
Breach of Contract (1982)
Breathless (1982)
Burning Love (1983)
The Scorpion (1984)
The Assault (1986)
A Month Later (1987)
Iris (1987)
Amsterdamned (1988)
Paint It Black (1989)
De Kassière (Lily Was Here) (1989)
Romeo (1990)
The Man Inside (1990)
Eline Vere (1991)
The Johnsons (1992)
Long Live the Queen (1995)
De Bovenman (2001)
The Discovery of Heaven (2001)
Amazones (2004)
Daylight (2013)
Doris (2018)

Director
 Mama's Proefkonijn (1996)
 Summer Heat (2008)

References

External links

1952 births
Living people
Dutch film actresses
Dutch television actresses
Dutch film directors
People from Landerd
Golden Calf winners
20th-century Dutch actresses
21st-century Dutch actresses
Dutch women film directors
Officers of the Order of Orange-Nassau